Yanagisawa Wind Instruments Co., Ltd. is a Japanese woodwind instrument manufacturing company known for its range of professional grade saxophones. Along with Yamaha, they are one of the leading manufacturers of saxophones in their country of origin. The company currently manufactures sopranino, soprano, alto, tenor, and baritone saxophones.

In the United States, Yanagisawa products are commercialized and distributed by Conn-Selmer, a subsidiary of Steinway Musical Instruments.

History

The history of woodwind manufacturing in Japan had its origins in 1894 when Tokutaro Yanagisawa began repairing imported woodwinds for military band members. Within that wartime setting, Tokutaro's repair shop soon evolved into an instrument factory—the first to build woodwind instruments on Japanese soil. Tokutaro's son Takanobu followed in his father's footsteps, choosing to pursue a career in the craft of instrument-making, and built his first prototype saxophone in 1951.

Starting in the late 1960s, Yanagisawa exported saxophones sold under various distributor's names, providing a large portion of the instruments sold under the Vito (Japan) brand and representing Leblanc's Martin brand for saxophones starting in 1971. In 1978, the 800 series models were introduced, which became the first Yanagisawa saxophones exported under Yanagisawa's own name. 

In 1980, the 500 series was introduced for sale under other brands in the student/intermediate market. The Yanagisawa name soon became known for the impeccable workmanship, accurate intonation, and playability of its products. With the growth of Yanagisawa's reputation, interest in finding Yanagisawa instruments sold under other brands has become heightened in the used instrument market. 

The Yanagisawa soprano saxophone designs became influential throughout rest of the industry, comparable to the influence of Selmer (Paris) and Yamaha saxophones in other ranges. Yanagisawa introduced innovations including detachable straight and curved necks and a high G key for its 990 series soprano saxophones.

Product development timeline:

1954

First tenor saxophone (the T-3 model) enters production

1956–1966

First alto saxophone (A-3) is unveiled, and A-5 alto and T-5 tenor models are introduced. Development work is completed on a low-A baritone model (B-6).

1968

Japan's first soprano saxophone (S-6) is placed on the market. The SN-600 sopranino model with high-E key is finished and released.

1978–1985

The Elimona (Elite Monarch) series (800 series) is launched. Japan's first curved soprano model is unveiled.
The world's first straight soprano model with detachable neck (S-880) is announced.

1990–1996

Yanagisawa's 900- and 990-series soprano and baritone models are introduced. The first Silver Sonic model (9930 series) is unveiled in soprano, alto, tenor, and baritone ranges, in Japan. Alto and tenor models are added to the 900 and 990 series, which later evolve into the 900μ and 990μ series.

1999

The A-9937 alto model with sterling silver neck, body, bow, and bell is announced.

2000

The sterling T-9937 tenor model hits the market and Yanagisawa introduces its top baritone model, the B-9930BSB. Yanagisawa launches the bronze-bodied 992GP series with gold-plated finish.

2001

The bronze 992PGP series debuts with new pink-gold plated models.

2002

The 9937PGP series is born, rounding out the all-sterling lineup with pink-gold plated models. Yanagisawa unveils its bronze A-902 alto.

2003

Yanagisawa unveils the T-902, the tenor version of its bronze alto model.

2004

The SC-991 and SC-992 curved soprano models are announced.

2006

Yanagisawa builds the A-9914, the world's first alto saxophone with neck, body, bow, and bell crafted entirely in 14K gold. Reference prototypes are exhibited at the Frankfurt Musikmesse trade show.

2008

The SC-9937 curved soprano sax with all-sterling neck, body, bow, and bell is introduced

2012

The WO series Alto is launched.

2014

The WO series Tenor is launched.

Production 
The company is notable for making saxophones from materials other than the standard brass (i.e., phosphor bronze and solid silver, and combinations thereof). Their first solid silver saxophone was produced in 1972 and instruments made from phosphor bronze began to be produced in 1992. The 8830 model alto and tenor saxophones, introduced in 1988, combined silver necks and bells with a brass body tube, reminiscent of the King "Silversonic" instruments. Similar combinations are offered in current production, as illustrated by Yanagisawa's 2015 range of alto saxophone offerings:

 AWO1 - made entirely from solid brass. The entry level professional saxophone from Yanagisawa. 
 AWO1U - same as AWO1, but unlacquered
 AWO1B - same as AWO1, but black lacquered 
 AWO1S - same as AWO1, but silver-plated
 AWO2 - made entirely from solid phosphor bronze (except keywork, which is brass)
 AWO2S - same as AWO2, but silver-plated
 AWO10 - made entirely from solid brass (underslung neck)
 AWO10U - made entirely from solid brass (underslung neck - unlacquered)
 AWO10S - same as AWO10, but plated with silver 
 AWO10GP - same as AWO10, but gold-plated
 AWO10B - same as AWO10, but coated with black lacquer
 AWO20 - made entirely from solid phosphor bronze (except keywork, which is brass)
 AWO20U - same as AWO20, but unlacquered 
 AWO20S - same as AWO20, but silver-plated
 AWO20PG - same as AWO20, but plated with "pink gold" (80% gold and 20% silver) 
 AWO20GP - same as AWO20, but gold-plated
 AWO30 - solid silver crook and body with solid brass bell and bow
 AWO32J - solid silver crook and bell, solid phosphor bronze body and bow (designed exclusively for jazz, so no 'lyre' socket)
 AWO33 - solid silver neck and bell; solid brass body, bow, and crook
 AWO35 - solid silver neck, body, and bell; solid brass bow
 AWO37 - solid silver crook, body, bow, and bell
 AWO37PG - same as AWO37, but pink gold-plated
 AWO37GP - same as AWO37, but gold-plated

The permutations are increased by the fact that it is possible to buy a solid brass, silver, or bronze neck from Yanagisawa and fit it to any of the nine instruments listed above (e.g., adding a solid silver neck to the AWO10 or AWO20 or a phosphor bronze neck to the AWO10, AWO32J, or AWO37).

Musicians 
Professional saxophonists performing on Yanagisawa instruments include Gary Bartz, Jay Beckenstein, Plas Johnson, Ed Wynne, Steve Slagle, Peter King, Vincent Herring, Snake Davis, Greg Osby, Antonio Hart, Jean Denis Michat, Paul Corn (Composer of the Paul Corn Jazz Collective), Pascal Bonnet, Jess Gillam, David Pons, Jeroen Vanbever and another classical and jazz players. Arno Bornkamp has performed occasionally with Yanagisawa Soprano. Raaf Hekkema use a Elimona Soprano as Standard instrument.

References

External links
 Official website

Musical instrument manufacturing companies of Japan